Fabio Hoxha (born 7 May 1993 in Durrës) is an Albanian football player who currently plays for Italian lower league side Salsomaggiore.

Club career
Hoxha joined the Inter Milan academy in 2003 where he played through the age groups before being loaned out to Piacenza for the 2010-11 season. He left Inter Milan once his loan with Piacenza ended, joining Varese in the summer of 2011.

Hoxha joined Albanian side KF Tirana in August 2012, where he made his professional debut. He was released by the club in March 2013.

He signed for Swiss side Team Ticino from Giubiasco in the summer of 2013, joining the club's U21 team for the 2013–14 season. In November 2018, he joined Salsomaggiore after an unsuccessful spell at Nibbiano & Valtidone.

References

1993 births
Living people
Footballers from Durrës
Albanian footballers
Association football forwards
Albania youth international footballers
Albania under-21 international footballers
KF Tirana players
Kategoria Superiore players
Albanian expatriate footballers
Albanian expatriate sportspeople in Switzerland
Expatriate footballers in Italy
Albanian expatriate sportspeople in Italy